John Curtis Caldwell (April 17, 1833 – August 31, 1912) was a teacher, a Union general in the American Civil War, and an American diplomat.

Early life
Caldwell was born in Lowell, Vermont. He graduated from Amherst College in 1855 and moved to Maine, where he was the principal of the Washington Academy in East Machias.

Civil War

At the beginning of the Civil War, Caldwell was 28 years old and had no military experience. However, his bearing as an academic principal seems to have impressed others because he was elected colonel of the 11th Maine Infantry regiment on November 12, 1861. Early in the Peninsula Campaign (April 28, 1862), he was promoted to brigadier general and assumed command of the 1st Brigade of the 1st Division of II Corps of the Army of the Potomac after the brigade commander, Brigadier General Oliver O. Howard, was wounded at the Battle of Seven Pines. At the Battle of Glendale, he displayed "personal gallantry" in coming to the aid of the beleaguered Union division led by Philip Kearny.

At the Battle of Antietam, on September 17, 1862, he briefly led his division when its commander, Major General Israel B. Richardson, was wounded. Caldwell himself was wounded in the battle and he received criticism that he handled his brigade poorly in the assault on the sunken road in the center of the Confederate line (the sunken road, or "Bloody Lane"). There were also rumors spread that he had hidden in the rear to avoid direct contact with the enemy. He was wounded again, twice, at the Battle of Fredericksburg that December, while preparing his brigade to assault the stone wall on Marye's Heights; one of his regiments broke and ran during the assault, further tarnishing his reputation. At the Battle of Chancellorsville the following May, his brigade performed well under difficult circumstances, covering the retreat of the army from the crossroads at the Chancellor House.

Caldwell's bloodiest combat experience was at the Battle of Gettysburg on July 2, 1863. Since May 22, he had commanded the 1st Division of the II Corps, now under Maj. Gen. Winfield S. Hancock. He and his division arrived on the battlefield on the morning of July 2 and took up a reserve position on Cemetery Ridge. That afternoon, as the powerful Confederate assault from the corps of Lt. Gen. James Longstreet, struck the Union III Corps, Hancock ordered Caldwell's division to reinforce the III Corps in the Wheatfield. Caldwell got his division moving quickly and conducted the largest Union assault of the three-day battle. However, due to a lack of adequate command on that portion of the battlefield, Caldwell's division was hit in its exposed right flank by the Confederate division of Maj. Gen. Lafayette McLaws, causing great confusion and a general retreat back across the Wheatfield.

Caldwell received criticism from Maj. Gen. George Sykes, the commander of the Union V Corps, who was operating nearby. General Hancock subsequently lost confidence in Caldwell and his staff conducted an investigation to determine whether Caldwell led his division properly. He was exonerated from any blame, but his reputation in the Army of the Potomac was damaged. A recent writer on Gettysburg has blamed Sykes for giving sketchy instructions to Caldwell.  In March 1864, the army was reorganized and reduced from five corps to three. Caldwell was relieved of command during this reduction and saw no further combat service.

Postbellum
After the war, Caldwell served in the honor guard for Abraham Lincoln's funeral train. He received a brevet promotion to major general on August 19, 1865, and he was mustered out of the volunteer service on January 15, 1866. He returned to civilian life as a lawyer and a member of the Maine Legislature, but he also served as the adjutant general of the Maine Militia from 1867 to 1869. He then entered the diplomatic service as the U.S. Consul in Valparaíso, Chile, from 1869 to 1874; U.S. Minister to Uruguay and Paraguay, 1874 to 1882; U.S. Consul to San José, Costa Rica, 1897 to 1909.

Caldwell died in Calais, Maine, and is buried at St. Stephen Rural Cemetery in St. Stephen, New Brunswick, Canada.

Gods and Generals
Caldwell appears briefly in the film Gods and Generals played by James Garrett. He is commanding his brigade at the assault on Marye's Heights during the Battle of Fredericksburg

See also

List of American Civil War generals (Union)

Notes

References
 Eicher, John H., and David J. Eicher. Civil War High Commands. Stanford, CA: Stanford University Press, 2001. .
 Hartwig, D. Scott. "'No Troops on the Field Had Done Better', John C. Caldwell's Division in the Wheatfield, July 2, 1863." In The Second Day at Gettysburg: Essays on Confederate and Union Leadership, edited by Gary W. Gallagher. Kent, OH: Kent State University Press, 1993. .
 Tagg, Larry. The Generals of Gettysburg. Campbell, CA: Savas Publishing, 1998. .

External links

1833 births
1912 deaths
People from Orleans County, Vermont
Ambassadors of the United States to Uruguay
Union Army generals
People of Vermont in the American Civil War
People of Maine in the American Civil War
People from East Machias, Maine
Amherst College alumni
American consuls
19th-century American lawyers